Olpoi Airport , also known as North West Santo Airport, is an airport in Olpoi on Espiritu Santo, Vanuatu.

References

Airports in Vanuatu
Sanma Province